Corythoichthys benedetto, commonly known as Benedetto's pipefish, is a species of marine fish of the family Syngnathidae. It inhabits the Indo-West Pacific, near Thailand, Myanmar, Indonesia, Papua New Guinea, and Australia. It is usually found alone, although it can be found in groups of up to four individuals. The specific name and common name honour the late Italian prime minister Benedetto Craxi (1934-2000).

Description

It may be identified by its body pattern of 12 thin white bars along the length of its body, each preceded by a thick red bar. These bars may be punctuated by variable-sized white ocelli.

References

Further reading

iNaturalist

benedetto
Marine fish
Fish described in 2008